Shedd is an unincorporated community and census-designated place (CDP) in Linn County, Oregon, United States, on Oregon Route 99E. As of the 2010 census it had a population of 204.

History
In 1858, a community and gristmill was established about a mile and a half east of the present town of Shedd and called "Boston", probably because one of the founders came from Boston, Massachusetts. Boston was platted in 1861 with a New England-style town square. The town became a stagecoach stop, and "Boston Mills" post office was established in 1869. Efforts to get the Oregon and California Railroad, which was being built south from Albany, to come through Boston Mills were unsuccessful. The railroad was instead built through the nearby land donated by Civil War veteran Captain Frank Shedd, and "Shedd's Station" was created in 1871. The post office was moved soon after. Many of Boston's buildings, though not the mill itself nor the Farwell DLC homestead, were moved west to the new Shedd's Station to be near the railroad. In 1899, the railroad changed the name of the station to "Shedd", but the name of the post office did not change until 1915.

East of Shedd at the former site of Boston Mills, on the Calapooia River, is the National Register of Historic Places-listed Boston Flour Mill (aka Thompson's Flouring Mill), Oregon's oldest continuously operating water-powered mill, part of Thompson's Mills State Heritage Site. It is one of the four remaining gristmills in the state, and one of only two mills still in operation.

Geography
Shedd is in western Linn County in the Willamette River valley, with Shedd Slough, a tributary of the Calapooia River, flowing northwards on the east side of town. Oregon Route 99E passes through the center of town, leading north  to Albany and south  to Halsey.

Demographics

References

External links
History of Boston Mills from Linn County Historical Society
Historic images of Shedd from Salem Public Library
Historic images of Thompson's Mill from Salem Public Library
Historic images of Shedd and the Shedd family from Webshots

Populated places established in 1858
Unincorporated communities in Linn County, Oregon
Census-designated places in Oregon
1858 establishments in Oregon Territory
Unincorporated communities in Oregon